Kazu is a Japanese given name for both sexes. Notable people with the name include:

, wife of 14th shōgun Tokugawa Iemochi
, Japanese footballer, often called Kazu
, Japanese swimmer
, Japanese Paralympic athlete
Kazu Hiro (born 1969), American prosthetic makeup artist
Kazu Kibuishi (born 1978), American graphic novelist
, member of the band Blonde Redhead
, Japanese footballer
 Gabriel Kazu, (born 1999) Brazilian footballer
 Christian Kendji Wagatsuma Ferreira, (born 2000) Brazilian footballer, commonly known as Kazu

Fictional characters
, in the anime series Doraemon
, in the Japanese TV series Gosei Sentai Dairanger

Other uses
 KAZU, radio station in Pacific Grove, California, US

See also
 Kaz (disambiguation)

Japanese unisex given names